Ward House may refer to:

in the United States
(by state, then city/town)

Dr. H. B. Ward House, Cuba, Alabama, listed on the National Register of Historic Places (NRHP)
Alma Ward Meeting House, Mesa, Arizona, listed on the NRHP in Maricopa County, Arizona 
Ward-Stout House, Bradford, Arkansas, NRHP-listed
Earl and Mildred Ward House, Conway, Arkansas, NRHP-listed
Mitchell-Ward House (Gentry, Arkansas), NRHP-listed
Ward-Jackson House, Hope, Arkansas, NRHP-listed
Ward-Hays House, Little Rock, Arkansas, NRHP-listed
Ward House (Los Angeles, California), a property that is on the List of Los Angeles Historic-Cultural Monuments in the San Fernando Valley
William Ward Jr. House, Middlefield, Connecticut, NRHP-listed
Welles-Shipman-Ward House, South Glastonbury, Connecticut, NRHP-listed
Ward-Heitman House, West Haven, Connecticut, listed on the NRHP in New Haven County, Connecticut
Thornton Ward Estate, Toledo, Illinois, NRHP-listed
J. C. B. Warde House, Muscatine, Iowa, NRHP-listed
Ward-Meade House, Topeka, Kansas, listed on the NRHP in Shawnee County, Kansas
Ward Brothers' House and Shop, Crisfield, Maryland, NRHP-listed
Richard Ward House, Andover, Massachusetts, NRHP-listed
John Ward House, in Haverhill, Massachusetts, a historic house included in the Buttonwoods Museum of the Haverhill Historical Society
Ephraim Ward House, Newton, Massachusetts, NRHP-listed
John Ward House (Newton, Massachusetts), a historic Federal-style house in Newton, Massachusetts
John Ward House (Salem, Massachusetts), a National Historic Landmark house
Joshua Ward House, Salem, Massachusetts, NRHP-listed
Gen. Artemas Ward Homestead, Shrewsbury, Massachusetts, NRHP-listed
Ward-Holland House, Marine City, Michigan, listed on the NRHP in St. Clair County, Michigan
Noah P. Ward House, Alexandria, Minnesota, listed on the NRHP in Douglas County, Minnesota
Roscoe P. Ward House, Waseca, Minnesota, listed on the NRHP in Waseca County, Minnesota
 Ward House (Enterprise, Mississippi), NRHP-listed
Junius R. Ward House, Erwin, Mississippi, NRHP-listed
Seth E. Ward Homestead, Kansas City, Missouri, NRHP-listed
Ward Hotel, Thompson Falls, Montana, listed on the NRHP in Sanders County, Montana
Whidden-Ward House, Portsmouth, New Hampshire, NRHP-listed
Ambrose-Ward Mansion, East Orange, New Jersey, NRHP-listed
Ward-Force House and Condit Family Cook House, Livingston, New Jersey, NRHP-listed
Moore-Ward Cobblestone House, Artesia, New Mexico, listed on the NRHP in Eddy County, New Mexico
C. W. G. Ward House, Las Vegas, New Mexico, listed on the NRHP in San Miguel County, New Mexico
Ward House (Childs, New York), included in Cobblestone Historic District
Breckwoldt-Ward House, Dolgeville, New York, NRHP-listed
Caleb T. Ward Mansion, on Staten Island in New York, New York NRHP-listed
William E. Ward House, Rye, New York, (and also in Greenwich, Connecticut), NRHP-listed
 Ward House (Syracuse, New York), NRHP-listed
 Ward House (Westfield, New York), NRHP-listed
King-Casper-Ward-Bazemore House, Ahoskie, North Carolina, NRHP-listed
Mitchell-Ward House (Belvidere, North Carolina), NRHP-listed
Dr. E. H. Ward Farm, Bynum, North Carolina, NRHP-listed
Ward-Applewhite-Thompson House, Stantonsburg, North Carolina, NRHP-listed
Ward Family House, Sugar Grove, North Carolina, NRHP-listed
Ward House (Hudson, Ohio), listed on the National Register of Historic Places in Summit County, Ohio
W. S. Ward House, Mansfield, Ohio, listed on the NRHP in Richland County, Ohio
Ward-Thomas House, Niles, Ohio, listed on the NRHP in Trumbull County, Ohio
John Q. A. Ward House, Urbana, Ohio, NRHP-listed
Elbert and Harriet Ward Ranch, Custer, South Dakota, listed on the NRHP in Custer County, South Dakota
Ward House (Houston, Texas), listed on the National Register of Historic Places in Harris County, Texas
Patrick L. and Rose O. Ward House, Springville, Utah, NRHP-listed
Milo P. Ward House, Port Townsend, Washington, listed on the NRHP in Jefferson County, Washington
 Ward House (Seattle, Washington), NRHP-listed
See-Ward House, Mill Creek, West Virginia, NRHP-listed
Ward Memorial Hall, Wood, Wisconsin, NRHP-listed

See also
Ward Hall (disambiguation)
Mitchell-Ward House (disambiguation)
John Ward House (disambiguation)
Monroe Ward, a neighborhood of Richmond, Virginia, that is NRHP-listed

Architectural disambiguation pages